The Quito trolleybus system is a bus rapid transit line located in Quito, Ecuador, which opened in 1995 and by 2002 was carrying approximately 220,000 passengers per day. It is managed by an agency of the municipality known as Empresa Metropolitana de Servicios y Administración del Transporte (EMSAT) and is operated by Compañía Trolebús Quito, S.A.  The service is named (informally) El Trole, Spanish for "The Trolley", meaning trolleybus; this name is shown on signage at stops, and is used in publicity and marketing. Before being a subsystem of a larger bus rapid transit system of Quito known as MetrobusQ, El Trole was itself a whole system. Its formal name is Corredor Trole or; simply Trole, currently.

The route

The trolleybus system is composed of a single 18.7-km line that runs, with a few exceptions, through the part of Ecuador Highway 35 (E 35) that is within Quito. The three segments of E 35 inside Quito are Avenida Diez de Agosto (northern Quito), Calle Guayaquil (center of Quito) and Avenida Pedro Vicente Maldonado (south of Quito).  Seven different passenger services, or circuitos, are operated along the trolleybus route, differing in their terminus locations but overlapping one another.

The initial 11.2-km line opened in three stages between 17 December 1995 and 21 April 1996, and connected the La "Y" district, in northern Quito and near Mariscal Sucre International Airport, to the El Recreo shopping mall (Centro Comercial El Recreo), in southern Quito, via the city center.  On 30 April 2000, the line was extended south by 5 km to Morán Valverde.  On 19 December 2008, it was extended farther south and east, by 2.5 km, to Quitumbe, where it terminates at a large new intercity-bus station.  This latest extension brought the length of the full line to 18.7 km.

Between the Machángara River and the Villa Flora stop, the line originally followed separate streets in opposite directions: southbound along Avenida Cardenal Carlos Maria de la Torre and northbound along Avenida Maldonado, but the section along Cardenal de la Torre was closed in 2003, and the route thereafter has followed Avenida Maldonado in both directions along that section.

Operation

Service is provided by a fleet of 113 articulated trolleybuses, built by Hispano Carrocera and Mercedes-Benz, with electrical  equipment by Kiepe Elektrik and AEG/Adtranz.  For the first phase, 54 vehicles were delivered in 1995-96. Another 59 very similar vehicles were delivered in 1999-2000 for the system's expansion.

The line operates in dedicated trolleybus-only lanes over almost its entire length, and the trolleybuses are given traffic-signal priority at most intersections.  Large terminals, called Estaciones, are located at the line's two original termini, Estación Norte La "Y" and Estación Sur El Recreo, and also at Morán Valverde and Quitumbe.  In between these large terminals are many smaller stations, known as paradas (or "stops"), spaced about 550 meters apart, on average.  In addition to the traffic separation and signal priority, other features of El Trole intended to facilitate fast service—and making the operation similar to many light rail lines—include the arrangements at stops:
 All fare collection takes place off of the vehicles, and the boarding area is a "paid area", to which passengers are given access (via turnstiles) only upon paying (to a ticket machine or agent) or showing a prepaid fare instrument such as a monthly pass. This allows boarding and alighting to take place simultaneously at all three doorways of each vehicle.
 All stops have high-level boarding platforms that are vertically aligned with the floors of the trolleybuses, allowing level, step-free boarding.  The vehicles are equipped at each doorway with bridge plates that fold down at stops, to bridge the gap between the vehicle and the platform.

The scheduled service frequency is very high at most times, over most of the line, with the headways/intervals being as short as 60 seconds during peak periods.  All four of the major Estaciones (transfer terminals) are served by several suburban bus routes, "feeding" the trolleybus line, and transfers made there are free.

The original operator of El Trole was a department of the municipal government known as Unidad Operadora del Sistema Trolebús (UOST), but around March 2008 operation was transferred to Compañía Trolebús Quito S.A., a newly formed private company that is believed to be still municipally owned.

Stop locations

These are the stations and stops of the trolleybus line and the street intersections where they are located:

Avenida Diez de Agosto:
Estación Norte - La "Y": Av. 10 de Agosto y Cofanes
Parada La "Y": Av. 10 de Agosto y Pereira
Parada Estadio (Estadio Olímpico Atahualpa): Avs. 10 de Agosto y Naciones Unidas
Parada La Carolina: Avs. 10 de Agosto y República
Parada Florón: Av. 10 de Agosto y Rumipamba
Parada Mariana de Jesús: Avs. 10 de Agosto y Mariana de Jesús
Parada Cuero y Caicedo: Av. 10 de Agosto y Cuero y Caicedo
Parada Colón: Avs. 10 de Agosto y Colón
Parada Santa Clara: Av. 10 de Agosto y Veintimilla
Parada Mariscal: Av. 10 de Agosto y Jorge Washington
Parada Ejido: Av. 10 de Agosto y Bogotá
Parada La Alameda: Av. 10 de Agosto y Ante
Parada Banco Central (Banco Central del Ecuador): Av. 10 de Agosto y Caldas (southbound only)
Parada San Blas (northbound only): Calle Montúfar y Guayaquil

Within the Centro Histórico:
Parada Plaza del Teatro: southbound stop at Guayaquil y Manabí, northbound stop at Montúfar y Manabí
Parada Plaza Grande: Guayaquil y Espejo (southbound only)
Parada Santo Domingo: Guayaquil y Rocafuerte

Avenida Maldonado:
Parada Cumandá: Avs. Maldonado y 24 de Mayo
Parada Recoleta: Av. Maldonado y la Exposición
Parada Jefferson Pérez: Av. Maldonado y El Sena (at the Machángara River crossing) (southbound only)
Parada Colina:  Av. Maldonado y Alpahausi (northbound only)
Parada Chimbacalle: Av. Maldonado near the terminal station of the Guayaquil & Quito Railway
Parada Villa Flora:  Av. Maldonado y Ernesto Terán
Estación Sur El Recreo: Av. Maldonado y Rivas

Along the route extensions opened in 2000 and 2008, mostly along Av. Hugo Ortiz, Av. Quitumbe Ñan and Av. Cóndor Ñan:
Parada Calzado
Parada España
Parada Quito Sur
Parada Internacional
Parada Ajaví
Parada Solanda
Parada Mercado Mayorista
Parada Quimiag
Parada Registro Civil
Estación Morán Valverde
Parada Amaru Ñan
Parada Cóndor Ñan
Estación Quitumbe

References

External links

"The Trolleybuses of Quito" (web page with history, map and 62 photos).
Map of system as of early 2009.
Official website (Spanish)

Public transport in Ecuador
Transport in Quito
Quito
Q